This article details the 2012 Indian Federation Cup Group stage.

The group stage features 16 teams: the 14 automatic qualifiers from the I-League and the 2 winners of the qualifiers.

The teams were drawn into four groups of four, and played each once in a round-robin format. The matchdays were from 19 September to 25 September.

The top team in each group advances to the Semi-Finals.

Group A

Group B

Group C

Group D

References

External links 
 The Indian Federation Cup at the-aiff.com

Group Stage